The following is an episode list for the series, Poor Paul

Season 1: September 16, 2008 - March 17, 2009

Season 2: June 23, 2009 - TBA

Lists of American comedy television series episodes